"South American Way" is a 1939 song with music by Jimmy McHugh and lyrics by Al Dubin. Carmen Miranda introduced the song in the 1939 Broadway musical The Streets of Paris. Miranda performed it on-screen a year later in her breakout role for U.S. audiences in the film Down Argentine Way (1940), causing it to become very popular in the United States.

Versions 
The song became very popular in the United States, and had cover versions by several international artists, and as part of the soundtrack of many American films.

In movies

References

1939 songs
Songs with lyrics by Al Dubin
Songs with music by Jimmy McHugh
Carmen Miranda songs
The Andrews Sisters songs
Guy Lombardo songs